The Biosphere Rules is a framework for implementing closed loop production in business. They emerged from a 2005 research project at IE Business School that identified the principles that facilitate circular processes in nature but interpreted for—and translated to—industrial production systems. The research indicated that adopting the principles allowed businesses to establish economically and environmentally sustainable closed-loop manufacturing systems.

The five principles that constitute the Biosphere Rules are briefly:

1. Materials parsimony.

Minimize the types of materials used in products with a focus on materials that are life-friendly and economically recyclable.

2. Value cycle.

Recover and reincarnate materials from end-of-use goods into new value-added products.

3. Power autonomy.

Maximize the power autonomy of products and processes so they can function on renewable energy.

4. Sustainable product platforms.

Leverage value cycles as product platforms for profitable scale, scope, and knowledge economies.

5. Function over form.

Fulfill customers’ functional needs in ways that sustain the value cycle.

This biomimetic framework contends that these principles facilitate the transition of human manufacturing systems business towards a functioning circular economy.

Origins 
The Biosphere Rules emerged from a research program established at the Center for Eco-Intelligent Management at IE Business School, a top-ranked European management institute.  Lead by Dr. Gregory Unruh, the  program identified the attributes of natural systems that allowed for the closed-loop production of organisms in the biosphere. These attributes were then used as a framework for analyzing concrete company examples in the program's second phase.  Case studies of first mover companies adopting closed loop or cradle-to-cradle design for product development found common elements that made closed-loop systems viable in a business context. Importantly, the identified elements were similar to the principles seen in natural systems, mapped onto human manufacturing approaches.

The principles were first published in the February 2008 issue the Harvard Business Review in an article entitled “The Biosphere Rules.” They were later expanded upon in a book entitled “Earth, Inc.: Using Nature’s Rules to Build Sustainable Profits” published in 2010 by the Harvard Business School Press.

The Five Biosphere Rules 

Rule #1: Materials Parsimony

The Materials Parsimony rule deals with constraining the number of types of materials used in product design and manufacturing. This is not to be confused with the sustainable business strategy of eco-efficiency which seeks to reduce the amount of materials used in production.

The parsimony rule comes instead from applying a biomimicry perspective to materials in the biosphere. The Periodic Table of the Elements encompass the 88 naturally occurring elements from arsenic to xenon. Yet despite this diversity of options, the biosphere relies on four elements—carbon, hydrogen, oxygen, and nitrogen (CHON)—as the foundation of every living thing on earth. Adding trace amounts of sulfur, phosphorus and calcium we can account for the weight of 99 percent of every living thing on the planet. Parsimony in the biosphere makes it possible break down an organism like a rabbit locally and reassemble its constituent materials into a tree, mushroom or even another rabbit.

The functional benefit of materials parsimony for circular economy is that it dramatically simplifies the logistics and transaction costs of recycling, while producing scale economies through supply concentration.  Applying the Materials Parsimony rule to industry requires simplifying of the number and types of materials used in products. While expecting business to use the same four elements as nature is currently impractical, businesses can dramatically reduce the number of materials employed in manufacture, with a small number doing the yeoman's work. For special isolated applications, a smaller set of select materials could be reserved and designed to be easily separated from the bulk of the product.  By making these choices, business could absorb a large percent of production within a circular materials economy.

A first step towards materials parsimony that some companies are using is the materials sourcing strategy known as “green screening,” which seeks to exclude potentially hazardous materials from products. Limiting the “materials palette” to environmentally benign inputs at the design stage makes dealing with product and process waste much easier. It also can have the effect of dramatically reducing the number of materials in the product designer's pallet. Beyond green screening, the emerging strategy of uni-materialization or monomateriality takes the material parsimony approach to its logical extreme by seeking to design products from a single material.

Rule #2: Value Cycling

The second principle - Value Cycling - refers to the actual cyclical reuse of materials from one high value use to another. It is called a “value cycle” to differentiate from the “value chain” model that is typical of current production approaches, whereby raw materials are converted into products and then into waste in a linear stepwise process.

In the biosphere, value cycling occurs at the atomic and molecular levels. The same materials that compose a leaf can be decomposed and incorporated into a new tree, a worm or other organisms. Technological limitations generally constrain human manufacturing system's ability to mimic natural molecular cycling, but the approach can be applied analogously at different levels. Materials in products can be value cycled in “shallow loops” or “deep loops”.

With “shallow-loop” cycling, manufacturers adopt recycling at the “components level” through the remanufacture,  refurbishment or reuse of product parts and components. In contrast, “deep-loop” recycling refers to the regeneration at the material level. Currently a limited number of materials can be deep-loop value cycled, such as metals, glass and some plastics. As green chemistry research results in new polymers that can be recycled at the materials level, greater adoption of deep-loop value cycling approaches can be implemented.

Rule #3: Power Autonomy

Every transformation of materials in nature - from turtle to tree - requires energy. In nature, the energy source is solar power captured biologically through photosynthesis. A tree's captured energy can then be transferred throughout ecosystems through the trophic pyramid to herbivores and carnivores. Plants and animals also have inherent biological processes that absorb energy and store it in chemical form for later use. Solar energy therefore serves as the basis of the biosphere's transformations of material.

Human manufacturing, in contrast, has relied primarily on fossil fuels like oil, gas and coal to extract and transform materials. Fossil fuels cannot be considered a sustainable energy solution for many reasons, including the fact that they are finite and their exploitation is reversing important planetary biogeochemical processes producing unwanted climatic and ecosystem impacts. The power autonomy rule applied to human manufacturing requires that products and production processes run on solar-motivated renewable energy sources as in the biosphere.

The power autonomy approach sees this occurring in a two step process.  The first step is to increase the energy efficiency products and production processes. As energy efficiency increases new options for generation and energy storage open up because less total energy is needed. The renewable energy technologies and energy storage technologies can be adopted that move the business towards a state of autonomous power generation.

Power autonomy can be seen from a fractal perspective in that it can occur at many levels. Power autonomy at the product level would be implemented by designing products that can capture and store their own energy. At the corporate level, a power autonomous company could be one that generates all its energy use from renewable sources. And power autonomy can be considered at the city or state level as in the concept of energy independence.

Rule #4: Sustainable Product Platforms

It is estimated that there 8.7 million species on the planet, yet all this diversity is built upon a single materials and energy platform consisting of a solar powered value cycle and a parsimonious materials pallet (CHON).   Nature's platform allows economies of scale, scope and knowledge that drive the proliferation of species into every habitable niche on the planet. Scale economies occur through reproduction and the duplicative growth of species population. Scope economies, on the other hand, come through speciation, the evolutionary emergence of new species, based on the same platform as individual species. Finally, knowledge economies arise through the accumulative encoding, refining and sharing of survival information genetically overtime in DNA.

The Sustainable Production Platform principle allows businesses to emulate nature's platform approach in manufacturing and generate similar economies. A sustainable product platform consists of a parsimonious materials palette and associated processing technologies that are assembled into a power autonomous value cycle that is flexible enough to produce a wide variety of products. If managers only use this system to produce a single product, the realized increasing returns would come solely from scale economies (spreading the fixed costs over an increasing unit output). Henry Ford exploited economies of scale by efficiently mass-producing a single car, the Model-T. But by treating the materials-process combination as a fundamental design platform and leveraging it across an entire family of products, managers can foster the scale, scope, and knowledge economies that will continually optimize the value cycle and build larger and more durable returns for their business and society.  In the 1920s, General Motors began exploiting an economy of scope by offering a variety of vehicle designs and brands built on a single automobile design platform.

Sustainable Product Platforms can be built across a spectrum of governance options. At one end manufacturers can vertically integrate all the stages of the value cycle retaining full ownership of their materials and product components. At the other extreme, value cycles can be completely open source where materials are value cycled through market forces. This is the case for most commodity recycling today such as steel and aluminum.

Rule #5: Function Over Form

Throughout the geological record, there is evidence of nature's constant evolutionary experimentation with life forms. Over billions of years, nature has produced innumerable species in an effort to take advantage of every ecological opportunity. But despite this evident diversity of forms, there are clear patterns in the ecological functions organisms fulfill.  Classes of organisms – producers, predators, pollinators, parasites – serve specific ecosystem functions. The form and its function are encoded in the genes of species, which allow the distributed local manufacturing of organisms necessary to fulfill needed ecosystem functions within the context of a globally integrated system.

In contrast, human manufacturing has tended to emphasize the commercialization of a specific product form rather than the underlying function that the product is intended to serve. Implementing the Biosphere Rules requires that engineers to shift design thinking towards providing a desired function, using the capabilities of the sustainable product platform as a design constraint on form. This approach logically leads to servicization and product of service strategies.

Implementation 
Implementing the Biosphere Rules at an established company require longterm strategic commitments and investment and there are many organizational and other barriers to adopting circular economy practices. The Biosphere Rules, however, were designed in a modular fashion that allows for stepwise implementation. A company can take action to review its input sourcing decisions and move towards greater materials parsimony without having to implement all the other rules simultaneously. Other rules can be implemented in a similar sequential manner which eases the disruption to existing systems and helps facilitate a smooth transition towards a circular business model. However, the ultimate goal is an integrated sustainable business system.

References 

Production and manufacturing
Bionics